The Castellani or 'Castelani', (Kastellanoi), were an ancient Iberian or Pre-Roman people of the Iberian peninsula. They inhabited the bottom of the eastern Pyrenees in the northern Tarraconense.

The Castellani are one of the groups mentioned by Claudius Ptolemy in his Geographia, book 2, chapter 5. 
Their main settlements were:
 Sebendunum (Σεβένδοννον), modern day Besalú
 Beseda (Βέσηδα), Sant Joan de les Abadesses
 Egosa (Ἐγῶσα)
 Basi (Βάσι)

See also
Iberians
Pre-Roman peoples of the Iberian Peninsula

References

External links
Detailed map of the Pre-Roman Peoples of Iberia (around 200 BC)

Pre-Roman peoples of the Iberian Peninsula
History of Catalonia
Ancient peoples of Spain